Slik was a 1970s Scottish pop group.

Slik may also refer to:

 Slik (album), by the Scottish pop group 
 Ivar Slik, racing cyclist
 Rozanne Slik, racing cyclist 
 SLIK Corporation, a manufacturer of photographic tripods

See also
 Slick (disambiguation)
 Silk (disambiguation)